The North Carolina Library Association (NCLA) is a professional organization for North Carolina's librarians and library workers. It is headquartered in High Point, North Carolina. It was founded on May 14, 1904, in Greensboro, North Carolina. The original organization had thirty-two charter members and Mrs. Annie Smith Ross from the Carnegie Library in Charlotte was the association's first president.

North Carolina had separate associations for black and white librarians until 1955. The North Carolina Negro Library Association (est. 1934) was the first black library association chapter in the ALA. The American Library Association decided to only allow one library association chapter per state, and as a result NCLA agreed to admit black members in 1954 and the two associations merged in 1955.

References

External links
 North Carolina Library Association website
 Southeastern Library Association website

Library associations in the United States
Organizations based in North Carolina